Saint-Loup-sur-Aujon (literally Saint-Loup on Aujon) is a commune in the Haute-Marne department in north-eastern France.

Geography
The Aujon flows northwestward through the middle of the commune; it crosses the two villages of the commune: Saint-Loup-sur-Aujon and Courcelles-sur-Aujon.

See also
Communes of the Haute-Marne department

References

Saintloupsuraujon